Roya Teymourian (born 19 March 1959 in Tehran) is an Iranian actress.

Selected filmography

Film
 Women's Prison
 Gharch-e Sammi
 Beed-e Majnoon (The Willow Tree, by Majid Majidi)
 Kafe Setereh
 Good to Be Back
 Polaris
 Conjugal Visit
 Leather Jacket

TV Film
 Love in Persian

TV Series
 Jeyran (TV series)
 Tenth Night
 Madare sefr darajeh  (Zero Degree Turn)
 Saate Sheni (sand clock)
 Shamsolemareh
 The Recall

References

External links
 

1959 births
Living people
People from Tehran
Actresses from Tehran
Iranian film actresses
Iranian stage actresses
Iranian television actresses
20th-century Iranian actresses
21st-century Iranian actresses